Régis Delépine (born 22 December 1946 in La Bohalle) is a French former professional road bicycle racer. In the 1974 edition of Bordeaux–Paris, he was ranked first together with Herman Van Springel, after Van Springel went the wrong way in the final.

Major results

1969
 1st Paris–Rouen
 1st Stage 7 Tour de l'Avenir
 2nd Paris–Roubaix Espoirs
1970
 1st Stages 2b, 6a, 7 & 8b Volta a Portugal
1972
 1st Stage 5b Critérium du Dauphiné Libéré
1973
 1st Paris–Camembert
 1st Stage 1 Tour d'Indre-et-Loire
 5th GP Ouest France-Plouay
 9th Paris–Roubaix
1974
 1st Bordeaux–Paris (together with Herman Van Springel)
 1st Stage 3 Tour d'Indre-et-Loire
 3rd Maël-Pestivien
 4th GP Ouest France-Plouay
1975
 1st Circuit de l'Indre
 2nd Bordeaux–Paris
 6th GP Ouest France-Plouay
1976
 1st Stages 2 & 4 Circuit Cycliste Sarthe
 1st Stage 4 Tour Méditerranéen
1977
 1st Paris–Bourges
 1st Stage 4 Tour de France
1978
 3rd Bordeaux–Paris
 3rd Grand Prix de Plumelec-Morbihan
1979
 1st GP de Peymeinade
 2nd Bordeaux–Paris
 2nd GP du Tournaisis
 6th GP de la Ville de Rennes
1980
 1st Circuit de l'Indre
 1st Stage 1 Tour de l'Oise
 4th Bordeaux–Paris

References

External links 

French male cyclists
1946 births
Living people
French Tour de France stage winners
Sportspeople from Maine-et-Loire
Cyclists from Pays de la Loire